Eesha Rebba (born 19 April 1990) is an Indian actress who predominantly works in Telugu films. She is known for her roles in Anthaka Mundu Aa Tarvatha (2013), Bandipotu (2015), Oyee (2016), Ami Thumi (2017), Darsakudu (2017), and Awe (2018).

Early life 
Eesha Rebba was born in a Telugu-speaking family in Warangal, and was brought up in Hyderabad. She holds an MBA. Rebba worked as a model during college, after which she received an audition call from director Mohana Krishna Indraganti.

Career 
Rebba made her debut in 2012 with the film Life Is Beautiful. She then made her first appearance in a lead role in the film Anthaka Mundu Aa Tarvatha. The film was successful at the box office and was nominated for Best Film at the International Indian Film festival in South Africa.

Her performance in the romantic-comedy film Ami Thumi received wide response and fetched her two awards. Rebba played the character of a lesbian woman in the film Awe (2018). Critics praised her performance in the film. Later, the same year she acted in four other films Brand Babu, Aravinda Sametha Veera Raghava, Subrahmanyapuram and Savyasachi. She made her Malayalam cinema debut in 2021 with the film Ottu. She learned archery and kickboxing for her role in the film.

Filmography

Films 
 All films in Telugu language, otherwise noted.

Web series

Awards and nominations

References

External links 

 

Indian film actresses
Living people
Actresses in Tamil cinema
Actresses in Telugu cinema
21st-century Indian actresses
1990 births
Actresses from Telangana
Telugu actresses
People from Warangal
Santosham Film Awards winners